Amen & Goodbye is the fourth studio album by American experimental rock band Yeasayer, released on April 1, 2016 on Mute.

Background and recording
For the first time, the band recorded live outside in wilderness located in upstate New York. The recording process for Amen & Goodbye took four years — longer than for any of the band's previous albums — which was exacerbated by damage to their tapes caused by a rainstorm.

Artwork
The cover art was created by sculptor David Altmejd, and was described by the band as, "Sgt Pepper meets Hieronymous Bosch meets Dalí meets PeeWee's Playhouse."

Critical reception
The album was described by Transverso Media as, "Yeasayer’s most heterogeneous body of work, both in terms of the patchwork of its sonic and textural peaks and valleys but also its blending of classic motifs with newly formed bizzarities in a way that never feels heavy handed or campy," stating, "they don’t just reconcile the worldbeat freak rock of All Hour Cymbals, psychedelic pop of Odd Blood, and brooding, dark electronica of Fragrant World, but manage to transcend time and space itself with a mélange of biblical allusions, futuristic sound, and countless other seemingly disparate stylistic and thematic juxtapositions."

Track listing

Charts

References

2016 albums
Yeasayer albums
Mute Records albums